The 1888 United States presidential election in Massachusetts took place on November 6, 1888, as part of the 1888 United States presidential election. Voters chose 14 representatives, or electors to the Electoral College, who voted for president and vice president.

Massachusetts voted for the Republican nominee, Benjamin Harrison, over the Democratic nominee, incumbent President Grover Cleveland. Harrison won the state by a margin of 9.38%.

Results

See also
 United States presidential elections in Massachusetts

References

Massachusetts
1888
1888 Massachusetts elections